Steven Paul Schinke (9 May 1945 – 1 January 2019) was an American academic.

Steven Schinke was born in Elkhorn, Wisconsin, to parents Edward and Vera Schinke on 9 May 1945. He graduated from Elkhorn Area High School and joined the United States Air Force. Upon his discharge from military service in 1967, Schinke enrolled at the University of Wisconsin–Madison, where he earned a bachelor's and master's degree in social work, and a doctorate in social welfare. Schinke began teaching at the University of Washington in 1975, and left for Columbia University in 1986, for an appointment as D'Elbert and Selma Keenan Professor of Social Work. While teaching at Columbia in the 1980s, Schinke also attended the Columbia Business School for a master's in business administration. He established a startup company and a non-profit organization. In 2011, Schinke was elected a fellow of the American Academy of Social Work and Social Welfare. He died of pulmonary fibrosis on 1 January 2019, in Roxbury, Connecticut.

References

1945 births
2019 deaths
Columbia Business School alumni
Columbia University School of Social Work faculty
University of Washington faculty
University of Wisconsin-Madison School of Social Work alumni
United States Air Force airmen
People from Elkhorn, Wisconsin
Military personnel from Wisconsin
Social work scholars